Michigan Road Toll House is a historic toll house located on the Michigan Road at Indianapolis, Marion County, Indiana.  It was built about 1850, as a simple one-story frame building.  It was raised to two stories in 1886.  The building operated as a toll house from about 1866 to 1892.  The building was also used as a post office, notary public office, and general store.

It was added to the National Register of Historic Places in 1974.

References

Transportation buildings and structures on the National Register of Historic Places in Indiana
Government buildings completed in 1850
Buildings and structures in Indianapolis
National Register of Historic Places in Indianapolis
Toll houses on the National Register of Historic Places
Road infrastructure in Indiana
Transportation in Indianapolis